The 1950–51 Santosh Trophy was the 7th edition of the Santosh Trophy, the main State competition for football in India. It was held in Calcutta, West Bengal. Bengal defeated Hyderabad 1–0 in the final. Bengal was captained by Sailen Manna.

Semi-finals

Final 

Mewalal's goal was scored in the 6th minute of the second half from a center by Saleh

Squads
 Bengal : M. Sarkar; B. Bose and S. Manna (captain); Latif, S. Sarbadhikary and A.Ghosh; Venkatesh, R Guha Thakurta, Mewalal, Ahmed Khan and Saleh
 Hyderabad : Ramaswamy; Ali and Fruvall; Patrick, Jamal, Noor, Moin, Layeek; Sussay (Sr), Sussay (Jr) and Mohammad

References 

Santosh Trophy seasons
1950–51 in Indian football